Bartolommeo Morelli (Bologna, c. 1560-Bologna, 1603) also called  il Pianoro, was an Italian painter from the baroque period, active mainly in quadratura and frescoes. He was a pupil of Francesco Albani in Bologna. His main work in Bologna were frescoes in the chapel of the Pepoli Family in San Bartolommeo di Porta. Malvasia refers to him as Bartolommeo Pianoro, who was also active in Genova at the same time as Andrea Sghizzi, another pupil of Albani.

References

1560s births
16th-century Italian painters
Italian male painters
17th-century Italian painters
Painters from Bologna
Italian Baroque painters
1603 deaths